Mountains Beyond Mountains: The Quest of Dr. Paul Farmer, A Man Who Would Cure the World (2003) is a non-fiction, biographical work by American writer Tracy Kidder. The book traces the life of physician and anthropologist Paul Farmer with particular focus on his work fighting tuberculosis in Haiti, Peru and Russia.

Summary
The book is written from the view of author Tracy Kidder. It is set mainly in Haiti and Boston, Massachusetts. Kidder first met his subject, Dr. Paul Farmer, in Haiti in 1994.

Farmer was born in Massachusetts and grew up as one of six children in a poor household in Florida. He studied at Duke and Harvard, where he earned his M.D and Ph.D. The rest of the book details Farmer's life and accomplishments, including his work with the health and social justice organization Partners in Health, especially in Haiti, Peru, and Russia.

Farmer died on February 21, 2022, in Rwanda.

Kidder describes Paul Farmer as follows:
"I was drawn to the man himself. He worked extraordinary hours. In fact, I don’t think he sleeps more than an hour or two most nights. Here was a person who seemed to be practicing more than he preached, who seemed to be living, as nearly as any human being can, without hypocrisy. A challenging person, the kind of person whose example can irritate you by making you feel you’ve never done anything as important, and yet, in his presence, those kinds of feelings tended to vanish. In the past, when I’d imagined a person with credentials like his, I’d imagined someone dour and self-righteous, but he was very friendly and irreverent, and quite funny. He seemed like someone I’d like to know, and I thought that if I did my job well, a reader would feel that way, too."

The book is primarily a biographical work broken into five parts.

PART I: Doktè Paul

Introduces Farmer's work at Brigham and Women's Hospital in Boston and at Zanmi Lasante founded by Partners In Health (PIH) in Cange, Haiti.

PART II: The Tin Roofs of Cange

Describes Farmer's family background and gives accounts of Farmer from sources close to him. Farmer's dedication to PIH led to the breaking off of his engagement to Ophelia Dahl, the daughter of noted author Roald Dahl and actress Patricia Neal. The two have remained close confidantes, and Dahl has continued to work for the PIH organization.

PART III: Médicos Aventureros

In 1995 MDR-TB claimed the life of a close friend known as Father Jack, in Lima, Peru. PIH co-founder Dr. Jim Kim convinces Farmer to extend PIH into Peru, where they fight against the rigid orders of the DOTS program. This was regulated by the World Health Organization, and largely supported financially by an American benefactor, Thomas J. White.

PART IV: A Light Month for Travel

Follows Farmer from Haiti to Cuba, Paris, Russia, and other locations in his quest to treat infectious disease.

PART V: O for the P

In 2000, PIH learns it has been awarded a $45 million grant, by the Bill & Melinda Gates Foundation, to combat MDR-TB in Lima, along with other organizations. "O for the P" refers to an expression within PIH that is a shortened form of saying “a preferential option for the poor”.

Awards and honors
2004 Book Sense Book of the Year Honor Book
2004 Lettre Ulysses Award for the Art of Reportage
2004 Boston Globe 100 Essential New England Books, #6
2004 ALA Notable Books for Adults
2003 New York Times Notable Book
2003 New York Times bestseller, first entered list at #14 on October 5, 2003.

Edition adapted for young people 
 Mountains Beyond Mountains (Adapted for Young People) with Michael French, 2014, 288 Pages,

References

External links
 Mountains Beyond Mountains at Penguin Random House with Reader's and Teacher’s Guides, etc.
A Conversation with Tracy Kidder about Mountains Beyond Mountains by Mark Klempner, 2008.
 Mountains Beyond Mountains resource page at Center for Curriculum Transformation, University of Washington Office of Minority Affairs & Diversity
Presentation by Kidder on Mountains Beyond Mountains, September 17, 2003, C-SPAN

2003 non-fiction books
Anthropology books
American biographies
Random House books
Novels set in Haiti
Novels set in Boston
Books about Peru
Books about Russia